Thrash Zone is the fifth album by the American crossover thrash band D.R.I., released in 1989. It continues the thrash metal style of the previous album, 4 of a Kind. Thrash Zone was D.R.I.'s most successful album to date, and produced the song "Beneath the Wheel", which was made as a music video and received airplay on MTV. The song also was featured in the video game Skate 2. The album also contained the song "Abduction" which would also have a video made for it.

Track listing

"Labeled Uncurable" and "You Say I'm Scum" are bonus tracks:
 "Labeled Uncurable" appears on the CD and as an LP bonus track.
 "You Say I'm Scum" appears as a CD-only bonus track.

Credits
 Spike Cassidy – guitar
 Kurt Brecht – vocals
 Felix Griffin – drums
 John Menor – bass

D.R.I. (band) albums
1989 albums